Yang Jisheng may refer to:

 Yang Jisheng (Ming dynasty) (1516–1555), Ming dynasty official and Confucian martyr
 Yang Jisheng (journalist) (born 1940), Chinese journalist